Aswān Governorate (Arabic: محافظة أسوان) is one of the governorates of Egypt. The southernmost governorate in Upper Egypt, covering most of Lake Nasser. The Governorate's capital is Aswan.

The Aswan Governorate borders Qena Governorate to the north, Red Sea Governorate to the east, New Valley Governorate to the west, and Sudan's Northern state to the south. It has a population of 1,394,687 inhabitants (2014), and occupies an area of 62,726 km².

Overview
The rate of poverty is more than 60% in this governorate but recently some social safety networks have been provided in the form of financial assistance and job opportunities. The funding has been coordinated by the country's Ministry of Finance and with assistance from international organizations.

Municipal divisions
The governorate is divided into the following municipal divisions for administrative purposes with a total estimated population as of July 2017 of 1,481,446. In some instances there is a markaz and a kism with the same name.

Population
According to population estimates from 2015 the majority of residents in the governorate live in rural areas, with an urbanization rate of only 42.3%. Out of an estimated 1,431,488 people residing in the governorate, 826,543 people live in rural areas as opposed to only 604,945 in urban areas.

Cities

The following are in Aswan Governorate.

Aswan
Daraw
Edfu
El Basaliya
 El Radisia - الرديسية
Kom Ombo
New Aswan
New Kalabsha
Sebaiya

Industrial zone
According to the Egyptian Governing Authority for Investment and Free Zones (GAFI), in affiliation with the Ministry of Investment (MOI), there is an industrial zone called El Shalalat located in this governorate:

Important sites

Abu Simbel
Kalabsha
Nekheb
Nekhen

See also
Governorates of Egypt

References

External links
 Official Website in English 
 El Wattan News of Aswan Governorate

 
Governorates of Egypt